The 1969 Quirino autonomy plebiscite was plebiscite on separating the sub-province of Quirino from the province of Nueva Vizcaya in terms of provincial administration in accordance with Republic Act No. 5554 that was enacted on June 21, 1969. The law provided a separate provincial board for the sub-province of Quirino while retaining it within Nueva Vizcaya's congressional district.

The plebiscite was held on November 11, 1969, and the results were announced on December 23, 1969.

Results

Summary

By municipality

References 

1969 referendums
1969 in the Philippines